Bobby Kerr may refer to:

 Robert Kerr (athlete) (1882–1963), Irish Canadian sprinter
 Bobby Kerr (businessman) (born 1960), Irish entrepreneur and businessman
 Bobby Kerr (footballer, born 1901) (1901–1972), Scottish footballer
 Bobby Kerr (footballer, born 1929) (1929–2012), Scottish football forward for Darlington, Third Lanark, Stirling Albion and Greenock Morton
 Bobby Kerr (footballer, born 1947), Scottish football midfielder for Sunderland, Blackpool and Hartlepool United

See also  
 Robert Kerr (disambiguation)